Womenswold is a village and civil parish centred  south-east of Canterbury, Kent, England, 1 mile to the east of the A2 road. The parish consists of three hamlets: Womenswold, Woolage Village and Woolage Green.

Historically, Womenswold has been recorded with various spellings, including Wymynswold and Wimlingswold. A further one may be Wymelyngewolde 

Originally 'Wymelyngewolde', from the combination of the possible personal name of ‘Wimel’ and the Old English ‘ingas’ meaning the ‘people of’ and ‘wald’ as a ‘forest’. Thus Womanswold, or 'Wymelyngewolde', means the ‘forest of the people of Wimel’.

The church of St, Margaret of Antioch covers all three hamlets, in Womenswold proper rather than the woodland, cereal and pasture fields within its bounds. A small mediaeval building without any side aisles, it is part of the Barham Downs group of churches.

References

External links

 Womenswold Parish Council
 Womenswold Church

Villages in Kent
City of Canterbury